Aghuz Kalleh (also Romanized as Āghūz Kalleh; also known as Āqez Kalleh) is a village in Siyarastaq Yeylaq Rural District, Rahimabad District, Rudsar County, Gilan Province, Iran. At the 2006 census, its population was 17, in 6 families.

References 

Populated places in Rudsar County